The Saraçhane Bridge, a.k.a. the Sultan's Bridge, Şahabettin Pashaa–Sultan Mustafa Bridge or Horozlu Köprüsü (Rooster Bridge) is an Ottoman bridge across the Tunca river in Edirne, Turkey.

The bridge was built in 1451 (AH 855) on the direction of Şahabettin Pasha, the Beylerbey of Rumelia in the court of Sultan Murad II (r. 1421–44, and then 1446–51). The bridge was repaired during the reign of Sultan Mustafa II in 1706 (AH 1113).

References

External links

Stone bridges in Turkey
Ottoman bridges in Turkey
Bridges in Edirne
Bridges completed in 1451
Arch bridges in Turkey
Bridges over the Tunca
1451 establishments in the Ottoman Empire